Pathogens and Disease  is a peer-reviewed scientific journal covering research on all pathogens (eukaryotes, prokaryotes, and viruses, including zoonotic pathogens).  It was originally established in 1988 as FEMS Microbiology Immunology when it split from FEMS Microbiology Letters. It was renamed FEMS Immunology and Medical Microbiology in 1993, and obtained its current name in 2013.

The journal is published by Oxford University Press on behalf of the Federation of European Microbiological Societies. The current editors-in-chief are Wilhelmina Huston, Alfredo Garzino-Demo, and Jörn Coers.

Abstracting and indexing
The journal is indexed and abstracted in:

According to the Journal Citation Reports, the journal has a 2020 impact factor of 3.166, ranking it 81st out of 137 journals in the category "Microbiology"; 112th out of 162 journals in "Immunology"; and 55th out of 92 journals in "Infectious Diseases".

References

External links

Microbiology journals
English-language journals
Oxford University Press academic journals
Publications established in 1993
9 times per year journals
Federation of European Microbiological Societies academic journals